John Mallory (born July 24, 1946) is a former professional American football player who played defensive back for the Philadelphia Eagles and Atlanta Falcons.

References

1946 births
American football safeties
West Virginia Mountaineers football players
Philadelphia Eagles players
Atlanta Falcons players
Living people
Sportspeople from Summit, New Jersey
Players of American football from New Jersey